Crno, belo i srebrno (trans. Black, White and Silver) is the debut album by the Serbian alternative rock band Block Out, released by ITV Melomarket records in 1994. The album was rereleased in 2000 by Metropolis records with the bonus track "Leto na Adi" ("Summer at Ada").

Track listing 
Tracks 1 to 5, written by Danilo Pavićević and Milutin Jovančić, tracks 6 to 12, written by Nikola Vranjković
 "Sanjaj me" (3:13)
 "Kiša" (3:14)
 "Ljubičasto (I)" (2:45)
 "Ljubičasto (II)" (2:28)
 "Ja znam" (4:06)
 "Osam i trideset" (6:06)
 "Neki moji drugovi" (6:31)
 "Ja ne želim da odeš" (3:25)
 "Eutanazija" (3:54)
 "Deponija" (6:40)
 "Rođendanska pesma" (5:15)
 "Leto na Adi" (Bonus track on the 2000 CD reissue) (8:40)

Personnel 
 Miljko Radonjić (drums)
 Dragan Majstorović (bass)
 Milutin Jovančić (vocals)
 Nikola Vranjković (guitar)

Additional personnel 
 Nemanja Popović (co-producer)
 Zoran Radetić (engineer [post-production])
 Balać (Aleksandar Balać; performer)
 Krle (Dragan Jovanović; performer)
 Leontina (Leontina Vukomanović; performer)
 Madamme Piano (Ljiljana Rančić; performer)
 Nemanja (Nemanja Popović; performer)
 Peđa Milanović (performer)
 Stevan Vitas (performer)
 Antiša (performer)
 Danilo Pavićević (performer [associate band member])
 Dean Dimitrijević (performer [associate band member])
 Dejan Škopelja (producer, performer)

External links 

 EX YU ROCK enciklopedija 1960-2006, Janjatović Petar; 
 Crno, belo i srebrno at Discogs

Block Out (band) albums
1994 debut albums
Metropolis Records (Serbia) albums
Grunge albums